Sydney Bonginkosi Nkalanga is a South African former footballer.

Career

India

Traded to East Bengal late 2005, Nkalanga did well with Mike Okoro up front at the 2005 Federation Cup, but was released by the Red & Yellow Brigade that winter before being loaned to Fransa-Pax and debuting as they scraped past Dempo SC with one point. However, the South African absconded on 6 March 2006 and decide to break off all contact with the club.

References 

Year of birth missing (living people)
Living people
East Bengal Club players
Fransa-Pax FC players
South African expatriate soccer players
South African soccer players
Association footballers not categorized by position